Fawler is a hamlet and civil parish in the valley of the River Evenlode,  southeast of Charlbury in Oxfordshire, England.  There are traces of a Roman villa at Oatlands Farm. The manor house was built in 1660.  Finstock railway station on the Cotswold Line is closer to Fawler than to Finstock.

References

Sources

Hamlets in Oxfordshire
Civil parishes in Oxfordshire
West Oxfordshire District